"Just Might (Make Me Believe)" is a song recorded by American country music group Sugarland. It was released in September 2005 as the third single from their debut album Twice the Speed of Life.  In addition, it was the only single of their career to be written solely by ex-member Kristen Hall, who left the group in early 2006.

Music video
A music video was released along with the song. It was shot completely in black and white, and features Jennifer Nettles roaming the countryside by herself, as well as all of the trio performing in a house. It was the last video to feature Kristen Hall before her departure.

Chart performance

Year-end charts

Personnel
As listed in liner notes.
Tom Bukovac – electric guitar
Brandon Bush – organ
Kristian Bush – mandolin, background vocals
Dan Dugmore – pedal steel guitar
Garth Fundis – background vocals
Kristen Hall – acoustic guitar, background vocals
Greg Morrow – drums
Jennifer Nettles – lead vocals, background vocals
Glenn Worf – bass guitar

References

2005 singles
Sugarland songs
Mercury Nashville singles
Songs written by Kristen Hall
Song recordings produced by Garth Fundis
Black-and-white music videos
2004 songs